Here are places that have the name Linia:

In Africa
Linia, Chad

In Europe
Linia, Corfu, Greece
 Linia, a village in Budeşti Commune, Vâlcea County, Romania
 Linia, a village in Grădiştea Commune, Vâlcea County, Romania

See also

Linea
Linia, Pomeranian Voivodeship (north Poland)